Spider and Rose is a 1994 Australian film directed by Bill Bennett and starring Ruth Cracknell, Simon Bossell, and Max Cullen. It is about the relationship between an elderly lady and a young ambulance driver.

Although the film was marketed as a comedy, Bennett says he never regarded the film as such, but a serious look at how we treat the aged.

It won the audience award at the Tromsø International Film Festival in 1995.

References

External links

Spider and Rose at Oz Movies

1994 films
Australian comedy films
Films directed by Bill Bennett
1990s English-language films
1990s Australian films